Kangiqhuk, formerly West Arm, is a fiord on the southeast coast of Victoria Island in Canada. The hamlet of Cambridge Bay is located close to the fiord and Cambridge Bay Airport is situated on the north side of the arm.

References

Victoria Island (Canada)
Fjords of Nunavut